Edwin Hoskin "Eddie" Vokes (April 1, 1908 – June 29, 1967) was a professional ice hockey player who played five games in the National Hockey League.  He played with the Chicago Black Hawks. He was born in Quill Lake, Saskatchewan.

External links

Ed Vokes' profile at Hockey Reference.com

1908 births
1967 deaths
Canadian ice hockey left wingers
Chicago Blackhawks players
Ice hockey people from Saskatchewan